Oscar Albeiro Figueroa Mosquera (born 27 April 1983) is a Colombian weightlifter, and Olympic Champion (gold-medalist) competing in the 62 kg category until 2018 and 67 kg starting in 2018 after the International Weightlifting Federation reorganized the categories. He was born in the rural township of Zaragoza, located in Cartago, Valle del Cauca, Colombia.

He initially retired from the sport after the 2016 Summer Olympics, but has returned to international competition and has competed at the 2018 World Weightlifting Championships. He formally announced his retirement again in November 2019.

Career

Olympics
At the 2004 Summer Olympics he ranked 5th in the snatch as well as the clean & jerk in the 56 kg category, lifting a total of 280 kg, and finished 5th overall.

In the Beijing 2008 Summer Olympics, Figueroa failed to make a lift in the snatch category, he was unable to lift the bar from the floor in all three attempts. After the competition, it was discovered that he had a c6/7 cervical hernia which weakened his right hand. He left the Olympics without posting a result and had surgery to correct the hernia.

In his return to the Olympics after his injury, he placed 3rd after the snatch portion of the competition with a lift of 140 kg. After failing to make his first two lifts in the clean & jerk portion, he successfully completed an Olympic Record lift of 177 kg. This gave him a total of 317 kg; bronze medalist Eko Yuli Irawan also had the same total, but Figueroa had a lighter body weight (61.76 kg vs 61.98 kg) and won the silver medal.

Earlier in 2016 Figueroa had surgery to repair his chronic back pain caused by a lumbar hernia, and returned to the Olympics hoping to win gold. On August 8, 2016, Figueroa finally won gold in the 62 kg division with a total of 318 kg. After attempting and failing to lift 179 kg to set a new Olympic Record, Figueroa took off his shoes and placed them on the platform, signaling his immediate retirement from the sport. On November 26, 2019, Oscar Figueroa formally announced his retirement from weightlifting competitions in a press conference.

World Championships
Figueroa participated in the men's -62 kg class at the 2006 World Weightlifting Championships and won the silver medal, finishing behind Qiu Le. He snatched 137 kg and jerked an additional 160 kg for a total of 297 kg, 11 kg behind winner Qiu.

He ranked 4th in the 62 kg category at the 2007 World Weightlifting Championships.

Failure to Report Whereabouts
On April 12, 2019, the International Weightlifting Federation (IWF) reported that Figueroa was not allowed to participate in multiple weightlifting events. This was due to Figueroa failing to report his whereabouts in a timely manner so the IWF could perform surprise doping tests as required by international anti-doping regulations. It was noted this failure-to-report did not mean Figueroa was involved in any doping cases opened by the IWF. When interviewed, Figueroa reported he failed to send them due to human error. He also reported that while he was prevented from participating in the 2020 Pan American Championship, he was not impeded from other competition that could help qualify him for the 2020 Tokyo Olympic Games.

Major results

References

External links

 
 
 

1983 births
Living people
Colombian male weightlifters
Olympic weightlifters of Colombia
Olympic gold medalists for Colombia
Olympic silver medalists for Colombia
Weightlifters at the 2004 Summer Olympics
Weightlifters at the 2008 Summer Olympics
Weightlifters at the 2012 Summer Olympics
Weightlifters at the 2016 Summer Olympics
Weightlifters at the 2011 Pan American Games
Sportspeople from Antioquia Department
World Weightlifting Championships medalists
Place of birth missing (living people)
Olympic medalists in weightlifting
Medalists at the 2012 Summer Olympics
Medalists at the 2016 Summer Olympics
Weightlifters at the 2015 Pan American Games
Pan American Games medalists in weightlifting
Pan American Games gold medalists for Colombia
Central American and Caribbean Games silver medalists for Colombia
Competitors at the 2006 Central American and Caribbean Games
Weightlifters at the 2019 Pan American Games
Central American and Caribbean Games medalists in weightlifting
Colombian people of African descent
Medalists at the 2011 Pan American Games
Medalists at the 2015 Pan American Games
Pan American Weightlifting Championships medalists
21st-century Colombian people